A Modern Marriage is a 1950 American drama film directed by Paul Landres and written by Samuel Roeca and George Wallace Sayre. The film stars Reed Hadley, Margaret Field, Robert Clarke, Nana Bryant, Burt Wenland and Christine McIntyre. It was released on July 10, 1950, by Monogram Pictures.

Cast          
Reed Hadley as Dr. Donald Andrews
Margaret Field as Evelyn Brown
Robert Clarke as Bill Burke
Nana Bryant as Mrs. Brown
Burt Wenland as Porter
Christine McIntyre as Nurse
Edward Keane as Dr. Connors
Charles Smith as Jimmy Watson
Buddy Gorman as Messenger Boy
Dick Elliott as Jim Burke
Lelah Tyler as Mrs. Burke
Pattie Chapman as Mary Burke
Buddy Swan as Spike
Frank Fenton as Mr. Brown
Sherry Jackson as Evelyn 
Dian Fauntelle as Secretary
Peggy Wynne as Nurse
Bret Hamilton as Delivery Man

Legacy
In the 1962 film Frigid Wife, a 12-minute prologue scene depicts a marriage counselor telling the story of A Modern Marriage as a case history for two patients. After the prologue, the entire A Modern Marriage film is included.

References

External links
 

1950 films
American drama films
1950 drama films
Monogram Pictures films
Films directed by Paul Landres
American black-and-white films
1950s English-language films
1950s American films